Turkey participated in the Eurovision Song Contest 2011 with the song "Live It Up" written by Kutlu Özmakinacı and Ergün Arsal. The song was performed by Yüksek Sadakat. The entry was selected through an internal selection organised by Turkish broadcaster Türkiye Radyo ve Televizyon Kurumu (TRT).

Before Eurovision

Internal selection 
In October 2010, Turkish Eurovision website eurovisiondream.com launched an online petition to persuade TRT to hold a national final instead of an internal selection, aiming to reach 10,000 signatures in two weeks. However, TRT announced on 1 January 2011 that the band Yüksek Sadakat had been internally selected to represent Turkey in Düsseldorf. Prior to the announcement of Yüksek Sadakat as the Turkish representative, rumoured artists in Turkish media included Atiye, Ayna, Hande Yener, Hayko Cepkin and Şebnem Ferah. Three songs, all written in English, were submitted by the band to the broadcaster in late January 2011 and a selection committee selected "Live It Up" as the song they would perform at the contest.

On 25 February 2011, "Live It Up" was presented to the public during a press conference that took place at the TRT Tepebaşı Studios in Istanbul, broadcast on TRT 1 as well as online via the official Eurovision Song Contest website eurovision.tv. The song was written by members of the band Kutlu Özmakinacı and Ergün Arsal.

At Eurovision 
Turkey competed in the first semi-final on 10 May 2011 but did not qualify for the final, placing 13th with 47 points. The public awarded Turkey 10th place with 54 points and the jury awarded 12th place with 58 points. This was the first and as of 2012, only time that Turkey did not make it to the final since the semi-final system was introduced in 2004. It was the first year that Turkey wasn't present in a Eurovision final since 1994, when they had been relegated due to a poor result in 1993.

Voting

Points awarded to Turkey

Points awarded by Turkey

References 

2011
Countries in the Eurovision Song Contest 2011
Eurovision